Byzantine Syrmia may refer to:

 Pannonia (Byzantine province) (567-582), first rule of the Byzantine Empire in the region of Syrmia
 Sirmium (theme), second rule of the Byzantine Empire in the region of Syrmia, from c. 1018 to c. 1071
 Byzantine Syrmia (1167-1180), third rule of the Byzantine Empire in the region of Syrmia

See also
 Syrmia (disambiguation)
 Byzantine (disambiguation)
 Duchy of Syrmia (disambiguation)